Łubniany  (German Lugnian, 1936-45: Lugendorf) is a village in Opole County, Opole Voivodeship, in south-western Poland. It is the seat of the gmina (administrative district) called Gmina Łubniany.

International relations

Twin towns – Sister cities
Łubniany is twinned with:
 Arnstein, Germany (since 22 May 1993)

References

Villages in Opole County